The Music Of Richard Marx: 1987-2009 is a multi-disc promotional compilation album of Richard Marx released by Chrysalis Music Group. This is Marx's seventh overall compilation album, but his first multi-disc compilation. It includes most of his singles from 1987 through 1997, some albums cuts from 1996 through 2004, four acoustic versions of some older songs, and a new version of "You Never Take Me Dancing."

Track listing
All songs written by Richard Marx, except where noted.

Disc 1
 "Don't Mean Nothing" (Marx, Bruce Gaitsch)
 "Should've Known Better"
 "Endless Summer Nights"
 "Hold On To The Nights"
 "Satisfied"
 "Right Here Waiting"
 "Angelia"
 "Too Late to Say Goodbye" (Marx, Fee Waybill)
 "Children of the Night"
 "Keep Coming Back"
 "Hazard"
 "Take This Heart"
 "Chains Around My Heart" (Marx, Waybill)
 "Now and Forever"
 "The Way She Loves Me"
 "Nothing Left Behind Us" (Marx, Waybill)
 "Angel's Lullaby"

Disc 2
 "Until I Find You Again"
 "Touch of Heaven"
 "One More Time"
 "Shine"
 "Almost Everything"
 "Straight from My Heart"
 "When You're Gone"
 "One Thing Left"
 "Love Goes On"
 "Again"
 "Colder"
 "The Other Side"
 "Your World" (acoustic)
 "Hazard" (acoustic)
 "Love Goes On" (acoustic)
 "Endless Summer Nights" (acoustic)
 "Never Take Me Dancing" (new version)

2009 compilation albums
Albums produced by Richard Marx
Richard Marx albums